Joel Andrés Burrola Muñoz (born January 19, 1993, in Ciudad Juárez, Chihuahua) is a Mexican professional footballer who currently plays for Saltillo F.C.

References

1993 births
Living people
Association football defenders
Indios de Ciudad Juárez footballers
FC Juárez footballers
UACH F.C. footballers
Saltillo F.C. footballers
Ascenso MX players
Liga Premier de México players
Tercera División de México players
Footballers from Chihuahua
Sportspeople from Ciudad Juárez
El Paso Coyotes players
Mexican footballers